Isachne veldkampii is a critically endangered species of herb endemic to the Western Ghats of India. It has been reported from Manipal in Udupi district in the state of Karnataka.

References

Panicoideae
Endemic flora of India (region)